I've Seen All I Need to See is the eighth full-length studio album by the American experimental metal band the Body. The album was released on January 29, 2021, through Thrill Jockey.

Background and release
On October 13, 2020, the Body announced the release of the album, I've Seen All I Need to See. The opening track, "A Lament" was served simultaneously as the album's lead single. It marks the duo's first non-collaborative studio album since I Have Fought Against It, but I Can't Any Longer. (2018). Recorded in 2019, the album was engineered by the duo's frequent collaborator, Seth Manchester, and mastered by Matt Colton. It features contributions from Chrissy Wolpert and vocalist Ben Eberle.

Composition
I’ve Seen All I Need to See relies on a more stripped-down production that departs from the orchestral arrangements, operatic vocals, and contemporary pop and chopped-and-screwed hip-hop production of their past releases. The production employs drums, vocals, and violently overdriven guitars, deriving its sound from death industrial and power electronics. Described by the band "as an exploration of the extremes and micro-tonality of distortion" the album lyrically addresses themes of death and despondence. The record opens with a reading of Scottish poet Douglas Dunn's "The Kaleidoscope", that was written by him after the early death of his wife, Lesley Dunn, in 1981.

Critical reception

At Metacritic, which assigns a weighted average rating out of 100 to reviews from mainstream publications, this release received an average score of 80 based on 7 reviews, indicating "generally favourable reviews".

Pitchforks  Grayson Haver Currin said that the album embraces the "bluntly fatalistic" sound of the duo by being "mercilessly distilled and efficient, reminding us there's no time to waste." Similarly, Sam Shepherd of musicOMH called it "a brutal album", writing that "somehow, there's an odd clarity to be found amongst all the noise, distortion and decay." Paul Simpson of AllMusic lauded the duo's "piercing vocals" and regarded the album as "undeniably some of their most direct and punishing work." Exclaim! writer Max Heilman praised the stripped-down concept and impenetrable execution of the album and summarized it as "the purest summation of the Body's artistry."

Track listing

Personnel 
Credits are adapted from AllMusic.

The Body
 Lee Buford – drums, vocals
 Chip King – guitar, vocals

Additional musicians
 Max Goldman – vocals
 Ben Eberle – vocals
 Seth Manchester – drums, programming, keyboard
 Chrissy Wolpert – piano, vocals

Production
 Seth Manchester – engineering, production
 Matt Colton – mastering
 Alexander Barton – art design, layout

References 

2021 albums
The Body (band) albums
Thrill Jockey albums